Valentin Vaerwyck (3 March 1882, in Ghent – 27 November 1959) was a Flemish Belgian architect.

External links
http://inventaris.vioe.be/dibe/persoon/4864

Architects from Ghent
1882 births
1959 deaths